Berhala Island may refer to:

Berhala Island, Sabah
Berhala Island, Sumatra
Berhala Island, Malacca Strait